The Richard-Penhoët 2 was a 1926 French, large, five-engined flying-boat airliner, carrying up to twenty passengers. The sole example flew in 1926 but was lost in 1928 during testing after modification to improve performance.

Design and development

The Richard-Penhoët was a monoplane with a three part cantilever wing, each part with the same span and with 5.4° of dihedral. The central panel was rectangular in plan and had a constant thickness/chord ratio of 20%, while the outer panels had symmetrical trapezoidal plans and tapered in thickness outwards to 8%. Wing construction was mixed, largely wooden with wire bracing and with four spruce and ash box spars and spruce and ply ribs. Apart from the leading edge of the central wing, which was covered with corrugated aluminium sheet, the wing was fabric covered. The whole of the trailing edge was filled with ply-covered ailerons.

The hull  was also of mixed construction. There were four longerons, the lower ones wooden and the upper ones steel, braced together with bulkheads. Its planing bottom, with a step below mid-wing and a double-curvature section, was constructed from two spruce, mahogany and teak layers, the space between them divided into eight watertight compartments. The sides were birch ply, reinforced nearer the water with teak. Upper and rear parts were fabric covered. Stability on the water was provided by a pair of unstepped floats under the wing, held a little beyond the central section on mountings within completely enclosing fairings. The vertical tail was metal-framed and fabric covered, with an in-flight adjustable, triangular fin and rectangular balanced rudder. The horizontal tail was built like the wing, with an in-flight adjustable, straight-tapered tailplane and narrow chord elevators, mounted on the fin just above the hull.

The pilots sat in an open, side-by-side cockpit on top of the hull, well forward above the wing and fitted with dual control; behind them there was a separate, similar cockpit for flight engineers or navigator. Internally the hull was divided into two decks linked by steps and entered by doors aft of the wing, one to each side of the upper deck. This was reserved for the crew, with sleeping quarters forward under the cockpits and access to most control systems. The windowed passenger cabin was below, with four rows of four seats separated by a central aisle, another two at the front and provision for two more. Behind the passenger cabin there were small cabins for the radio-operator and for the captain, plus toilets and a baggage store.

The large flying boat was power by five  Gnome-Rhône Jupiter uncowled nine-cylinder radial engines. Four were mounted close to the wing leading edges and the fifth, at the same height, over the bow. Fuel was held in the central wing section, with four tanks on each side.  The wing engines could be reached in flight by a walkway with  headroom, 

The Richard-Penhoët 2's first flight was in August 1926 and about ten flights were made between 21 August and 9 September, with Duhanel at the controls. Behaviour on take-off and in the air was good but the performance was lower than expected. The engines were also ungeared, leading to high tip speeds and their associated inefficiencies.

The modifications kept the flying boat grounded for a year before restarting flight testing in 1928 but on 26 April, piloted by Victor Lucas, assisted by engineers Denis Provost and Marcel Lecoq and with designer Lewis Quincé observing, it crashed from low altitude into the Loire estuary. Pilot and engineers were rescued but Quincé died. Early reports suggested the fin broke away, taking with it the tailplane and elevators.

Specifications

See also

References

Flying boats
Five-engined tractor aircraft
High-wing aircraft
2